Masato Kumashiro (熊代 聖人, born April 18, 1989 in Kumakōgen, Ehime) is a Japanese professional baseball outfielder for the Saitama Seibu Lions in Japan's Nippon Professional Baseball.

External links

NPB.com

1989 births
Living people
Baseball people from Ehime Prefecture
Japanese baseball players
Nippon Professional Baseball outfielders
Saitama Seibu Lions players
Japanese baseball coaches
Nippon Professional Baseball coaches